Bad Girls Club: Social Disruption is the sixteenth season of the Oxygen reality television series Bad Girls Club. At the end of the reunion of Bad Girls Club: Twisted Sisters, it was revealed there would be a sixteenth season titled Social Disruption. On July 21, 2016, the full cast was announced with a premiere date of September 20, 2016. Before the season officially began, a casting special aired on September 13, 2016. 
This season features Bad Girls who are prominently known and have a following on social media.

Cast

Original Bad Girls

Replacement Bad Girls

Duration of Cast

Episodes

Notes

References

External links
 

2016 American television seasons
Bullying in television
Bad Girls Club seasons
Television shows set in Los Angeles